Mimus is a bird genus in the family Mimidae. It contains the typical mockingbirds. In 2007, the genus Nesomimus was merged into Mimus by the American Ornithologists' Union. The genus name is Latin for "mimic".

The following species are placed here:
 Brown-backed mockingbird, Mimus dorsalis
 Bahama mockingbird, Mimus gundlachii
 Long-tailed mockingbird, Mimus longicaudatus
 Patagonian mockingbird, Mimus patagonicus
 Chilean mockingbird, Mimus thenca
 White-banded mockingbird, Mimus triurus
 Northern mockingbird, Mimus polyglottos
 Socorro mockingbird, Mimus graysoni
 Tropical mockingbird, Mimus gilvus
 Chalk-browed mockingbird, Mimus saturninus

The Nesomimus group includes the following species endemic to the Galápagos Islands:
 Hood mockingbird, Mimus macdonaldi
 Galápagos mockingbird, Mimus parvulus
 Floreana mockingbird or Charles mockingbird, Mimus trifasciatus
 San Cristóbal mockingbird, Mimus melanotis

The Nesomimus group is endemic to the  Galápagos Islands. These mockingbirds were important in Charles Darwin's development of the theory of evolution by natural selection.

Previous to the merger between Nesomimus and Mimus scientists have proved in 1971 that both groups can produce hybrids. Robert I. Bowman and Anne Carter have studied a female Galápagos mockingbird and a male from the long-tailed mockingbird subspecies Mimus longicaudatus punensis that have interbred. They raised a hybrid offspring to adulthood.

See also
 List of commonly used taxonomic affixes

References

External links

Darwin's Mockingbirds; a site about the Nesomimus group run by Professor Robert L. Curry of Villanova University.

 
Bird genera
Mockingbirds
Taxonomy articles created by Polbot